Mario Eduardo Villasanti Adorno (born 2 July 1982 in Fernando de la Mora, Paraguay) is a Paraguayan footballer who plays for Cienciano.

Career
Villasanti made his professional debut for Paraguayan club Tacuary in 2003.  He also played for Fernando de la Mora, Sportivo Iteño, and Sportivo Luqueño all clubs in Paraguay.  At the end of 2007, Villasanti was named by the Paraguayan newspaper Última Hora as best player of the year. He played for Sportivo Luqueño at the time.  Villasanti was the first goalkeeper and first player not to play for Cerro Porteño to win the award, which has existed since 2004. In January 2008, he was signed by Audax Italiano to replace Nicolás Peric as the team's starting goalkeeper. He returned to Sportivo Luqueño in 2009.

External links

1982 births
Living people
People from Fernando de la Mora, Paraguay
Paraguayan footballers
Paraguayan expatriate footballers
Fernando de la Mora footballers
Sportivo Luqueño players
Sportivo Iteño footballers
Club Tacuary footballers
Audax Italiano footballers
Expatriate footballers in Chile
Expatriate footballers in Peru
Association football goalkeepers